Tim Swinson (born 17 February 1987 in London, England) is a former Scotland international rugby union player. His preferred position was lock. He recently played for Saracens in Premiership Rugby. He retired from rugby in June 2022.

Rugby Union career

Amateur career

Swinson was drafted to Ayr in the Scottish Premiership for the 2017-18 season.

Professional career

Swinson has played for Newcastle Falcons in the English Premiership. He made his Newcastle 1st XV debut against Bath during the 2007–08 season. Swinson ended a disappointing season for the Newcastle Falcons by being named the Falcons Player of the Year. 
Swinson finished runner up behind Brian McGookin for Falcons player of the year in 2009-10.

He signed a deal with Glasgow Warriors to join them from Newcastle Falcons in the 2012–13 season.

He announced his retirement from the game in May 2020 in order to pursue an apprenticeship in the same garage that his Scotland and Glasgow Warriors team-mate Gordon Reid holds a position in.

Despite having previously announced his retirement he signed a one-year contract with Saracens ahead of the 2020–21 season. He extended his contract by a further year ahead of Saracens' return to the Premiership the following season.

International career

He played for Scotland 'A' making his debut in 2013 against England Saxons He won 38 caps for Scotland.

References

External links
Newcastle Falcons profile

1987 births
Living people
Scottish rugby union players
Newcastle Falcons players
People educated at Oundle School
Glasgow Warriors players
Saracens F.C. players
Scotland international rugby union players
Scotland 'A' international rugby union players
Ayr RFC players
Glasgow Hawks players
Rugby union flankers
Rugby union locks
Rugby union players from London